Athletics at the 1960 Summer Paralympics consisted of 25 events, 13 for men and 12 for women.

Participating nations

Medal summary

Men's events

Women's events

References 

 

 
1960 Summer Paralympics events
Paralympics
1960
1960 Paralympics